Rodrigo Daniel Santiago Pintos (born February 17, 1990, in Montevideo, Uruguay) is a professional soccer player from Uruguay who currently plays for Icon FC.

Career

Club
During his time in the states Santiago played most of his youth club soccer in Parsippany Soccer Club. In early 2009, he joined New Jersey Rangers and played only a single game in the USL Premier Development League due to an injury that kept him off the fields for the rest of the season.

Professional
Santiago moved back to Uruguay in July 2009 after 12 years in the United States of America. He joined the u-19 of Juventud de Las Piedras of the Uruguayan Primera División, in 2010 he joined new founded Canadian Soccer Club that was entering the Uruguayan Segunda División Amateur . In 2013, he helped the club win their first ever championship and promotion to the professional Uruguayan Segunda División. Santiago also scored the first official goal in the history of the club Canadian Soccer Club from Uruguay. "Lolo" signed his first professional contract in October 2013 on a one-year agreement with the club. In August 2014 he returned to the United States and signed with professional club team Icon FC of the American Soccer League (ASL) on a one-year deal agreement as well .

References

1990 births
Living people
Uruguayan footballers
Expatriate soccer players in the United States
USL League Two players
Association football forwards
People from Montevideo
Association football midfielders
Uruguayan expatriate footballers
Uruguayan expatriate sportspeople in the United States
Canadian Soccer Club players
Juventud de Las Piedras players